Blitz (originally Vic New York, then later New York Blitz) is an action game published by Commodore for its VIC-20 home computer in 1981. The game is based on the 1977 arcade game Canyon Bomber from Atari, Inc., replacing the goal of clearing boulders with bombing closely packed skyscrapers. Several later clones of the concept also use the urban setting. The game is played with a single button which drops a bomb.

Blitz was followed by Blitz-64 for the Commodore 64 and Blitz-16 for the Commodore 16.

Gameplay
A plane flies across a single-screen cityscape at a steady speed. When it reaches the edge of the screen, it wraps to the other side at a lower altitude, with its speed increasing each pass. The player drops bombs from the plane, and each bomb removes one or more segments of the structure it hits. As the plane descends, it risks colliding with remaining buildings. The level is complete when all buildings are destroyed, and the plane has descended safely to the bottom of the screen.

Development
The game was prompted by a verbal description of the arcade game Canyon Bomber (Atari, Inc., 1977). The change from a canyon filled with rock pillars to a city of skyscrapers was copied by later clones including Blitz (ZX Spectrum), City Bomber (C64), and City Lander (ZX81).  

Simon Taylor wrote the game as Vic New York before he contracted with Commodore in 1982. Taylor later produced versions for the Commodore 64, Commodore 16, and Epson HX-20 portable computer.

Legacy
Mastertronic later sold the game as the budget-priced New York Blitz.

Jeff Minter wrote a 1982 ZX Spectrum game inspired by Blitz called Bomber (also published as City Bomber).

References

1981 video games
VIC-20 games
Video games developed in the United Kingdom